Gobeyr (also known as Boneh-ye ‘Alī-Mardān Khān and Gobeyr-e Pā’īn) is a village in Shoaybiyeh-ye Sharqi Rural District, Shadravan District, Shushtar County, Khuzestan Province, Iran. At the 2006 census, its population was 138, in 23 families.

References 

Populated places in Shushtar County